The Ghenanma (Arabic غنانمة) are an Arab tribe of the Saoura region in southwestern Algeria.  Their principal settlements (ksars) stretch between Béni Abbès and Talmine, including El Ouata.  A local chronicle mentions them as raiding a caravan in this region in 1599, and by about 1660 their power had grown to the point that they were imposing taxes on the Touat oases.  They continued to play a significant role in Touat's politics into the 19th century, through both treaties of protection and raids.

Arab tribes in Algeria